Psilocybe carbonaria is a species of mushroom in the family Hymenogastraceae.

See also
List of Psilocybe species
Psilocybin mushroom
Psilocybe

References

Entheogens
Psychoactive fungi
carbonaria
Psychedelic tryptamine carriers
Fungi of North America